Temitope is a common name of Yoruba origin meaning "Mine is worthy of thanks or gratitude."
A related name; Tiwatope means "Ours is worthy of thanks or gratitude." It is mostly a name given by parents to express gratitude sometimes to things that might have surrounded the birth of the child. It is a unisex name.

The name is rarely used as surname but it is common as first name or middle name.

Notable people with the names include:
Temitope Ojo, British rugby player
Temitope Fagbenle, British basketball player
Temitope Tedela, Nigerian actor
Temitope Joshua, Nigerian clergy
Amina Temitope Ajayi, American businesswoman
Oluwabusayo Temitope Folarin, American writer
Unoaku Temitope Anyadike, Nigerian model
Temitope Akinnagbe, American actor
Tope Obadeyi, English footballer
Tiwatope Savage, Nigerian actress and singer

References

Yoruba given names
Unisex given names